The Okolona, Houston & Calhoun City Railway company was incorporated in Mississippi in 1933 and purchased the 38 mile long Mobile & Ohio branch line running from Okolona to Calhoun City, MS. The railroad offered daily passenger service along the towns served via railbus and several freight trains a week.

Competition from highways eroded traffic on the line and the OH&CC filed to abandon in 1938. By 1940 the tracks were removed.

Motive Power
OH&CC had two steam locomotives and a railbus in their roster:
Baldwin Locomotive Works 4-6-0 # 9
Rogers Locomotive and Machine Works 4-6-0 # 184
Gasoline powered railbus (Converted from a Greyhound bus)

Preservation
The OH&CC depot in Houston, Mississippi survives as a farm implement dealership.

References

Mississippi railroads
Defunct Mississippi railroads